Hymie's Basement is the debut studio album by American indie rock duo Hymie's Basement. It was released on Lex Records in 2003. Much of the album was recorded at Hymie's Vintage Records.

Critical reception
Scott Reid of Stylus Magazine gave the album a grade of C+, saying: "The real problem with this record, like with Fog's Ether Teeth and Why?'s Oaklandazulasylum (both also released this year), is the inability to use the momentum of its several great ideas to produce an effective whole." Dan Lett of Pitchfork gave the album an 8.3 out of 10, saying: "Unlike many two-man collaborative efforts, ego and testosterone are mostly left out of the equation on Hymie's Basement, replaced by misanthropy and self-deprecation." He added: "Thematically, the record has a unity that suggests a long-term alliance but the vibrant arrangements buzz with the exhilaration of a new relationship."

Track listing

Personnel
Credits adapted from liner notes.

 Jonathan Wolf – production, performance
 Andrew Broder – production, performance
 Fancy Ray McCloney – vocals (8)
 Jeremy Ylvisaker – recording (2, 3, 4, 5, 6, 7, 8, 10, 11, 12, 13, 14)
 Tom Herbers – recording (1, 9, 15)
 George Horn – mastering

References

External links
 

2003 debut albums
Hymie's Basement albums
Lex Records albums